Eustace Albert Baggett (March 6, 1903 – May 12, 1976) was an American football and basketball coach. He served as head football coach at West Texas State Teachers College—now known as West Texas A&M University—in Canyon, Texas from 1933 to 1939. Baggett compiled a 36–28–5 record in seven seasons and currently ranks third on the schools all-time winning list behind Joe Kerbel (68–42–1) and Frank Kimbrough (54–52–2). 

He was also the head basketball coach at West Texas State from 1934 to 1942. He was then the head coach at Brooklyn College from 1947 to 1950, compiling a career college basketball coaching record of 216–93; he was followed as a coach at Brooklyn by Tubby Raskin. 

Baggett was a graduate of Ouachita Baptist University in Arkadelphia, Arkansas and pursued a master's degree at Columbia University. Prior to being hired at West Texas State in 1933, he coached at Vernon High School in Vernon, Texas, Wichita Falls Junior College—now known as Midwestern State University, and Amarillo Junior College—now known as Amarillo College.

He is the great-uncle of model, Alley Baggett.

Head coaching record

College football

References

External links
 

1903 births
1976 deaths
Brooklyn Bulldogs men's basketball coaches
Midwestern State Mustangs football coaches
West Texas A&M Buffaloes athletic directors
West Texas A&M Buffaloes basketball coaches
West Texas A&M Buffaloes football coaches
High school football coaches in Texas
Junior college football coaches in the United States
Columbia University alumni
Ouachita Baptist University alumni
Brooklyn College faculty